The Miami Hurricanes women's soccer team represent University of Miami in the Atlantic Coast Conference (ACC) of NCAA Division I women's college soccer.

The team has participated in two conferences, the Big East and the ACC and has not won a conference championship.  The team has advanced to the NCAA Tournament five times but never made it further than the tournament's second round.

History

1990s
The Hurricanes women's soccer program was launched in 1998. The team initially was not part of any collegiated conference. They finished their inaugural season in 1998 with a record of 8–5–1. Jim Blankenship was the program's first coach. In 1999, the women's soccer team joined Big East Conference play at a time when the university was a full member of the conference.  The team improved on its previous season, finishing 12–8–0 and 2–3–0 in conference play.  The Hurricanes qualified for the Big East Conference Women's Soccer Tournament, but lost in the first round.  This was the team's first ever postseason appearance.

2000s
The 2000s began with a 9–10–1 season that saw the Hurricanes again qualify for the Big East Tournament.  2001 saw more postseason action when the team qualified for its first ever NCAA Tournament.  However, before the 2002 season, head coach Jim Blankenship resigned as head coach.  Tricia Taliaferro was hired from Illinois to be the second head coach in the program's history.  Overall records of 9–9–1 marked Taliaferro's first two years at the helm.  In both seasons, the team finished second in the Big East, and lost in the first round of the Big East Tournament.  2004 marked the Hurricanes first year as a member of the Atlantic Coast Conference.  The first season in the ACC proved a difficult one, with the team finishing 3–13–0 overall, and 1–8–0 in the conference.  2005 saw the team end a streak of six conference tournament appearances.  In 2007 and 2008, the team made back to back ACC Tournament and NCAA Tournament appearances, losing if the first round in all four attempts.  2009 saw the team finish with a similar record but fail to make either tournament.

2010s

The Hurricanes started out the 2010s with a 10–8–1 record, and failed to qualify for the ACC and NCAA tournament.  After the season, Taliaferro was dismissed as head coach.  Tom Anagnost was hired as the new head coach prior to the 2011 season.  In Anagnost's first season, the team achieved their best ever NCAA finish, making it to the second round.  Another NCAA appearance in 2012 was not enough to save Anagnost's job.  After a 9–7–4 overall record, he was relieved of head coaching duties.  Shortly thereafter, Mary-Frances Monroe was hired to be the new head coach.  Monroe's first few seasons proved difficult, with the team finishing 11th or 12th in the ACC in 2013, 2014, and 2015.  2014 and 2015 also saw the Hurricanes lose double digit games.  The team had a slight turn around in 2016, qualifying for the ACC tournament, but losing in the first round.  Following a 5–11 2017 season, Monroe was fired as head coach.  Prior to the 2018 season, Sarah Barnes was named the school's new head coach.  Her first year saw some improvement with the team finishing 6–9–3, but extended a run of missing the NCAA tournament to six straight years.

2020s

The decade started with a season shortened by the COVID-19 pandemic.  The Hurricanes finished 1–11–1 and 0–8–0 in ACC play.  It was the first time in program history that they finished a season winless in conference play and it was a program low for total wins in a season.  The Hurricanes' struggles continued in 2021, as they finished 4–12–0 overall and 1–9–0 in ACC play.  2022 did not see much improvement for the Hurricanes as they finished 5–8–3 overall and 2–7–1 in conference play.

Personnel

Team management

Updated December 9, 2022

Seasons

^In 1999, the Hurricanes began play in the Big East Conference.
†In 2004, the Hurricanes moved to the Atlantic Coast Conference.

Notable alumni

Current Professional Players 

 Beverly Yanez (2007–2009) – Currently Assistant Coach with NJ/NY Gotham FC
 Jesse Shugg (2012–2013) – Currently with Blue Devils FC
 Catalina Pérez (2013–2016) – Currently with Real Betis
 Paula Forero (2012) – Currently with PSE Conquistadores
 Phallon Tullis-Joyce (2014–2018) – Currently with OL Reign

References

External links
 

Miami Hurricanes women's soccer
NCAA Division I women's soccer teams
1998 establishments in Florida
Sports in Coral Gables, Florida